Purcellville Historic District is a national historic district located at Purcellville, Loudoun County, Virginia.  It encompasses 490 contributing buildings and 8 contributing structures in the central business district and surrounding residential areas in the town of Purcellville.  The buildings represents a range of architectural styles popular during the 19th and 20th centuries in rural Virginia. Notable buildings include the former Purcellville School, Purcell House and Store, Bethany United Methodist Church, St. Francis de Sales Catholic Church, Purcellville National Bank (1915), Town Hall (1908), and Asa Moore Janney House (late 1840s). The Bush Meeting Tabernacle is located in the district and separately listed.

It was listed on the National Register of Historic Places in 2007.

References

Historic districts in Loudoun County, Virginia
National Register of Historic Places in Loudoun County, Virginia
Purcellville, Virginia
Historic districts on the National Register of Historic Places in Virginia